is a kind of Buddhist temple.  Ankoku-ji may mean  "Temple for National Pacification". There are numerous Ankoku-ji throughout Japan and the world.

The Ankoku-ji system was developed under the Ashikaga shogunate, as part of its stabilizing the country.  The Fudoin Temple within Higashi-ku, Hiroshima, for example, was built by Shōgun Takauji Ashikaga as one of 60 Ankoku-ji temples which were constructed in all provinces across Japan, in the 14th century.

Specific ones in Japan include:

Ankoku-ji (Aichi), located in Kōta, Aichi Prefecture
Ankoku-ji (Aira), located in Aira, Kagoshima Prefecture
Ankoku-ji (Ayabe), located in Ayabe, Kyoto Prefecture
Ankoku-ji (Azumino), located in Azumino, Nagano Prefecture
Ankoku-ji (Chinoshi), located in Chino, Nagano Prefecture
Fudoin Temple in Higashi-Ku, Ushita-shinmachi, Hiroshima.
Ankoku-ji (Fukuoka), located in Fukuoka, Fukuoka Prefecture
Ankoku-ji (Fukuyama), located in Fukuyama, Hiroshima Prefecture
Ankoku-ji (Gifu), located in Ikeda, Gifu Prefecture
Ankoku-ji (Ichikawa), located in  Ichikawa, Chiba Prefecture
Ankoku-ji (Iki), located in Iki, Nagasaki Prefecture
Ankoku-ji (Iwanuma), located in Iwanuma, Miyagi Prefecture
Ankoku-ji (Katori), located in Katori, Chiba Prefecture 
Ankoku-ji (Kitakyushu), located in Kitakyushu, Fukuoka Prefecture
Ankoku-ji (Kunisaki), located in Kunisaki, Ōita Prefecture 
Ankoku-ji (Kurume), located in Kurume, Fukuoka Prefecture
Ankoku-ji (Kitakyushu), located in Kitakyushu, Fukuoka Prefecture
Ankoku-ji (Kyōto), located in Kyoto, Kyoto Prefecture
Ankoku-ji (Naha), located in Naha, Okinawa Prefecture
Ankoku-ji (Nankan), located in Nankan, Kumamoto Prefecture
Ankoku-ji (Odowara), located in Odawara, Kanagawa Prefecture
Ankoku-ji (Saikai), located in Saikai,  Nagasaki Prefecture
Ankoku-ji (Satsumasendai), located in Satsumasendai, Kagoshima Prefecture
Ankoku-ji (Shimotsuke), located in Shimotsuke, Tochigi Prefecture
Ankoku-ji (Takarazuka), located in Takarazuka,  Hyōgo Prefecture
Ankoku-ji (Takayama), located in Takayama, Gifu Prefecture
Ankoku-ji (Toyooka), located in Toyooka, Hyōgo Prefecture
Ankoku-ji (Yonago), located in Yonago, Tottori Prefecture

Further reading

Buddhist temples in Japan